Ogea Levu (pronounced ) is a coral island on a barrier reef in Fiji's Southern Lau archipelago.

A  area covering both Ogea Levu and nearby Ogea Driki is the Ogea Important Bird Area. The Important Bird Area covers the entire range of the near threatened Ogea monarch. The makatea forest and Ogea monarch habitat of the island contribute to its national significance as outlined in Fiji's Biodiversity Strategy and Action Plan.

The people of Ogea are known for their happy and carefree approach to life, and love laughter and merry-making wherever they are gathered. They work hard in their daily lives, mainly in planting root crops, and fishing in their rich fishing grounds around both their islands which are surrounded by magnificent reefs and coral atolls. 
The chief of Ogea is traditionally known as the Matua Tabu i Tui Nayau, Tui Ogea (Sacred Elder of the Tui Nayau, the Tui Ogea).

References

Islands of Fiji
Lau Islands
Preliminary Register of Sites of National Significance in Fiji
Important Bird Areas of Fiji